Zamani Lekwot (born 19 July 1944)  in Jankasa, is a retired Nigerian Army major general who served as the military governor of Rivers State, Nigeria from July 1975 to July 1978 during the military administration of Generals Murtala Muhammed and Olusegun Obasanjo.
Lekwot is an Atyap, born in Kaduna State in 1944.

Military career
Lekwot attended the prestigious Nigerian Military School for his secondary education before he entered the army on 11 July 1962, and attended the Nigerian Military Training College, Kaduna and the Indian Military Academy, gaining his commission on 14 July 1966.
He was a company commander in the 6th Battalion when it took part in the battle that caused the fall of Bonny on 26/27 July 1967 during the Nigerian Civil War.
He was the Commander, 33 Infantry Brigade, Maiduguri in 1975 before he assumed the Military Governorship of Rivers State.
During his military career, Lekwot also served as Commandant of the Nigeria Defence Academy, General Officer Commanding 82 Composite Division, Nigerian Army and Ambassador/High Commissioner to the Republics of Senegal, Mauritania, Cape Verde and the Gambia.

The 2 Brigade Nigerian Army Barracks in Port Harcourt, Rivers State was named the Zamani Lekwot cantonment in his honor. In August 2003 it was renamed the Port Harcourt Barracks.
Lekwot fell out with General Ibrahim Babangida, and was forced to retire on 31 December 1985 after Banbangida became Chief of Staff following the military coup of 31 December 1983 that brought General Muhammadu Buhari to power.

Later career
On 15 May 1992 violence erupted between the mainly Moslem Hausa and mainly Christian Atyap communities of the Zangon-Kataf Local Government Area in Kaduna State, with many deaths.
A tribunal set up by the Babangida government sentenced Lekwot and 16 others to death for alleged complicity in the killings, sentences eventually reduced to a short gaol sentence.
It was said that his sentence was due to his feud with Babangida.
He was assisted in his prolonged battle to avoid execution by Barr. (Col.) Yohanna A. Madaki.
By December 1995, Lekwot had received a state pardon.

In June 2003 he was Chairman of Giza Ventures Nigeria and a Director of Prudent bank.

Chieftaincy
Lekwot was in January 2014 honoured by the Agwatyap, the traditional ruler of Atyap Chiefdom with the title, "Agwabyin" meaning "Guardian of the land".

References

Living people
Nigerian prisoners and detainees
1940 births
Nigerian military governors of Rivers State
Recipients of Nigerian presidential pardons
Prisoners and detainees of Nigeria
Nigerian Defence Academy Commandants
Indian Military Academy alumni
Nigerian Military School alumni
Atyap people
People from Kaduna State